The 1935 National Challenge Cup was the annual open cup held by the United States Football Association now known as the Lamar Hunt U.S. Open Cup.

Eastern Division

Western Division

a)aggregate after 5 games, Central advances on 2 wins to Wieboldt's 1

Final

First game

Second game

Third game

 The St. Louis Central Breweries F.C. took the championship 7-6 on aggregate.

Sources
St. Louis Post-Dispatch

U.S. Open Cup
Nat